Tadeusz Jodłowski (1925 – 31 October 2015) was a Polish artist.

Career
Born in Piekary Śląskie, he graduated from the Academy of Fine Arts in Krakow in 1951.  Jodłowski has worked as an artist taking part in exhibitions both in Poland and abroad since 1953.  Amongst his contributions were Cyrk posters belonging to the Polish School of Posters.

He is equally proficient using graphic forms, painterly means of expression or shapes derived from sculpture. He currently concentrates on print-making.

Major awards
1955 -1st Prize, Posters -10th Anniversary of the Polish People's Republic, PL
1956 -1st Prize -Polish Olympic (Melbourne, AU) Poster Competition, PL
1959 -Tadeusz Trepkowski Prize, Warsaw, PL –2nd Prize at “15 lat PRL” exhibit in Warsaw, PL
1961 –Award - Int’l Exhibition of Publishing Art (IBA) in Leipzig, Germany
1965 -3rd Prize -Polish Poster Biennale, Katowice, PL
1973 -2nd Prize -Polish Days Poster, Göttingen, Sweden
1979 -1st Prize -International Tourismus -Borse, Berlin, Germany
1985 -”Best Poster of the Year”, Warsaw's Best Poster Competition, Warsaw, PL

Major exhibitions include
1962 -Galerie in der Biberstrasse, Vienna, Austria
1965, 1967, 1971, 1975, 1985, 1987, 1989 –Polish Poster Biennales, Katowice, PL
1966, 1968, 1970, 1972, 1974, 1976, 1978, 1980, 1984, 1986, 1988, 1990 -International Poster Biennales, Warsaw, PL
1969, “Gallery of the Street”, Helsinki, Finland
1970, 1974, 1978, 1982, 1986, 1990 Poster Biennales, Brno, Czech Republic

Other exhibitions
Washington DC, USA (1964); Berlin, Germany (1973); Hanover, Germany (1978); Moscow, USSR (1990); Prague, Czech Republic (1990)

Important positions include
Art Director, (1955–1964), WAG (Graphic Arts Publishers), state poster publisher, Warsaw, PL
General Secretary, International Poster Biennale, Warsaw, PL (1986 – present)
Professor, Warsaw Academy of Fine Arts, Warsaw, PL

References

External links
 Profile of Tadeusz Jodłowski at Culture.pl

1925 births
2015 deaths
Polish poster artists